Shri Jai Parkash Aggarwal (born 11 November 1944) is a politician from the Indian National Congress party and was a Member of the Parliament of India representing North East Delhi in Lok Sabha, the lower house of the Indian Parliament. In the 2009 Indian general election, he defeated the Bharatiya Janata Party candidate by a margin of over 200,000 votes. In the 2014 Indian general election, he lost to Bhartiya Janta Party candidate Manoj Tiwari by a margin of about 380,000. He came in a distant third in the results.

Positions held

References

1944 births
Living people
Indian National Congress politicians from Delhi
Lok Sabha members from Delhi
India MPs 1984–1989
India MPs 1989–1991
India MPs 1996–1997
India MPs 2009–2014
Delhi University alumni
People from North East Delhi district
United Progressive Alliance candidates in the 2014 Indian general election
Agrawal